This is a list of roads designated A24. Roads entries are sorted in the countries alphabetical order.

 A24 motorway (Austria), a road connecting Vienna and the A23 to Stockerau

 A 24 motorway (Germany), a road connecting Hamburg and Berlin
 A24 motorway (Italy), a road connecting Rome and the Adriatic Sea
 A24 motorway (Portugal), a road connecting Viseu and Chaves 
 A-24 motorway (Spain), a proposed road to connect Daroca and Burgos
 A 24 road (Sri Lanka), a road connecting Matara and Akuressa
 A24 road (United Kingdom) may refer to:
 A24 road (England), a road connecting London and Worthing
 A24 road (Isle of Man), a road connecting the A3 and the A5
 A24 road (Northern Ireland), a road connecting Belfast and Clough

See also
 List of highways numbered 24